Beyer Boulevard station is a station on the Blue Line of the San Diego Trolley located in San Ysidro neighborhood of San Diego. The stop serves as a park and ride commuter center in addition to providing access to the surrounding residential areas.

History

This station was originally scheduled to undergo renovation starting December 2014, as part of the Trolley Renewal Project, though actual renovation construction didn't begin until January 2015; it reopened with a renovated station platform in June 2015.

Station layout
There are two tracks, each with a side platform.

See also
 List of San Diego Trolley stations

References

Blue Line (San Diego Trolley)
Railway stations in the United States opened in 1981
San Diego Trolley stations in San Diego
1981 establishments in California